The 2023 United Rentals Work United 500 was a NASCAR Cup Series race held on March 12, 2023, at Phoenix Raceway in Avondale, Arizona. Contested over 317 laps – extended from 312 laps due to an overtime finish, on the one mile (1.6 km) oval, and it was the fourth race of the 2023 NASCAR Cup Series season.

Report

Background

Phoenix Raceway is a 1-mile, low-banked tri-oval race track located in Avondale, Arizona, near Phoenix. The motorsport track opened in 1964 and currently hosts two NASCAR race weekends annually including the final championship race since 2020. Phoenix Raceway has also hosted the CART, IndyCar Series, USAC and the WeatherTech SportsCar Championship. The raceway is currently owned and operated by NASCAR.

Entry list
 (R) denotes rookie driver.
 (i) denotes driver who is ineligible for series driver points.

Practice

Practice results

Qualifying

Qualifying results

Race

Race results

Stage Results

Stage One
Laps: 60

Stage Two
Laps: 125

Final Stage Results

Stage Three
Laps: 127

Race statistics
 Lead changes: 10 among 6 different drivers
 Cautions/Laps: 5 for 35 laps
 Red flags: 0
 Time of race: 3 hours, 0 minutes and 18 seconds
 Average speed:

Penalties
Prior to the race, NASCAR confiscated the louvers (the hood radiator duct) of all Hendrick Motorsports teams and that belonging to Justin Haley (Kaulig Racing)'s car. On March 15, 2023, NASCAR punished all five teams with $100,000 fine and deduction of 100 driver and owner points each, as well as 10 playoff points and four-race suspensions for the respective crew chiefs, as the modifications were deemed to be an L2 violation. For the No. 9 team, only the owner points were affected as Josh Berry competed as a Xfinity Series regular and thus cannot score or lose points in the Cup Series, while Chase Elliott's driver points remain unaffected as he sat out of the race due to an injury. For Hendrick Motorsports, it was the largest fine imposed to an organization as a whole at $400,000, breaking the fine imposed to Michael Waltrip Racing in 2013 ($300,000) for manipulating the finish of the 2013 Federated Auto Parts 400.

Additionally, Denny Hamlin was fined $50,000 and docked 25 driver points for his collision with Ross Chastain, after he admitted on his Actions Detrimental podcast that the collision was deliberate. Two of Aric Almirola's crew members were also suspended after his right-front wheel fell out during the race.

Media

Television
Fox Sports covered their 18th race at the Phoenix Raceway. Mike Joy, Clint Bowyer and Danica Patrick called the race in the booth for Fox. Jamie Little and Regan Smith handled the pit road duties, and Larry McReynolds provided insight from the Fox Sports studio in Charlotte.

Radio
MRN covered the radio action for the race which was also simulcasted on Sirius XM NASCAR Radio. Alex Hayden, Jeff Striegle, and 2018 NASCAR champion winning crew chief Todd Gordon called the race when the field races past the start/finish line. Dan Hubbard called the action from turns 1 & 2, and Kyle Rickey called the action from turns 3 & 4. Pit lane was manned by Steve Post, Georgia Henneberry, and Brienne Pedigo.

Standings after the race

Drivers' Championship standings

Manufacturers' Championship standings

Note: Only the first 16 positions are included for the driver standings.

Notes

References

2023 in sports in Arizona
2023 NASCAR Cup Series
March 2023 sports events in the United States
NASCAR races at Phoenix Raceway